Gary Jenkins is a former association football player who represented New Zealand at international level.

Jenkins made a solitary official international appearance for New Zealand as a substitute in a 2–1 win over Bahrain on 8 October 1979.

References 

Year of birth missing (living people)
Living people
New Zealand association footballers
New Zealand international footballers
Association footballers not categorized by position